Birthplace of Country Music Museum is a museum celebrating the historic 1927 Bristol Sessions, which recorded some of the earliest country music in America when the Carter Family and Jimmie Rodgers and several other musicians recorded for the first time before gaining prominence.  The museum is located at 520 Birthplace of Country Music Way in Bristol, Virginia. A live radio station WBCM-LP broadcasts from within the museum. The original site of the Bristol recordings is marked by a plaque several blocks from the museum.

See also
 List of music museums
 WBCM-LP

References

External links
Birthplace of Country Music Museum

Buildings and structures in Bristol, Virginia
American country music
American music awards
Museums established in 2014
Music museums in Virginia
Music of East Tennessee
2014 establishments in Virginia
Country music museums